Seppi Hurschler (born June 23, 1983 in Stans) is a Swiss Nordic combined skier who has competed since 2001. Competing in three Winter Olympics, he earned his best finish of ninth in the 4 x 5 km team event at Vancouver in 2010 while earning his best individual finish of 22nd in the 15 km individual at Turin in 2006.

Hurschler's best finish at the FIS Nordic World Ski Championships was fifth in the 4 x 5 km team event at Sapporo in 2007 while his best individual finish was 17th in the 15 km individual event at those same championships.

His best World Cup finish was fourth in a 10 km individual normal hill event at Austria in 2010.

References

1983 births
Nordic combined skiers at the 2002 Winter Olympics
Nordic combined skiers at the 2006 Winter Olympics
Nordic combined skiers at the 2010 Winter Olympics
Living people
Olympic Nordic combined skiers of Switzerland
Swiss male Nordic combined skiers
People from Stans
Sportspeople from Nidwalden